North American cinema generally refers collectively to the film industries of the United States, Mexico, and Canada.

Unlike in Mexico, The term is cultural rather than geographic; the film industries of Cuba is normally considered part of Latin American cinema.

See also
 Cinema of the United States
 Film in Florida
 Cinema of Canada
 Cinema of Quebec
 Cinema of Mexico
 World cinema

References

 
Cinema by continent